The First (1926) and Second (1927) Treaties of Tirana were signed in Tirana between Albania and Italy, focusing on the Albanian economy and military. They allowed Italy to gain power over the country and join the Axis Powers.

Background

Albania 1920s-1930s 

The two Treaties of Tirana were signed both between Albania and Italy. At the time the country of Albania was under the kingship of Zog I of Albania, known in Albanian as the king of the Albanians, Mbreti i Shqiptarëve. In 1925, Ahmet Zogu, was elected president for seven years and on 1 September 1928, during his swearing ceremony he proclaimed himself as the King. Being the first and the last king of the Albanian nation, he served the country from 1922 until he fled to London during the start of the Second World War in 1939. Albania was thought by Italy as the portal for the rest of the Balkan countries, Greece and the Near Eastern countries. In May 1925, Albania accepted the proposal of the Italians and the Albanian National Bank was founded. It acted as the country's treasury despite being solely controlled by the Italian banks. For the first time, Albania had its own national coin minted. The proposal came with a five-year loan equivalent of about 2 million pounds of that time. In non-official meetings with Italian officials, Zog expressed his sympathy for Mussolini and the Italians. He even promised economic concessions to them further peaking their interest in the country of Albania. From the beginning seizing the power as king of the Albanians, Zog wanted to:

 Develop the Albanian economy.
 Legitimise the power of the country and his sovereignty.
 Achieve recognition of his government by neighbouring states. Zog knew that without any external support he would not be able to achieve these. Zog accepted to restore order in his country and help with its development. The 1925 agreement also oversaw mineral concessions of the Albanian land. During this time, the Italo-Albanian relations were favoured more and more by Italy. Mussolini had two orientations regarding the future of Albania. On one hand, it was a peaceful orientation for an Albanian economic diffusion until a de facto protectorate over Albania was achieved and on the other hand, for the accomplishment of a permanent imperialistic occupation. This weakened the King's economic hold and slowly gave way for the two Treaties to be signed by Zog and the Italian dictator, Mussolini.

First Treaty of Tirana (1926) 
On November 27, 1926, Italy signed with Albania the First Treaty of Tirana (Pakti i Parë i Tiranës), the Treaty of Peace and Security, in Albanian Pakti Italo-Shqiptar i Miqësisë dhe i Sigurimit. The treaty had a duration validity of five years. It pushed Tirana to accept Italian officers and ranking members into their army and police to oversee the Albanian army and train it. King Zog fearing that the unrest of his people will lead to the loss of his throne, signed the treaty. Italy proclaimed Albania as its "guarantor". The two countries would provide support to each other, whether it be military or economic. The treaty consisted of five articles.

 Anyone going against the existing Albanian status quo affairs would be seen as an enemy of both the Albanian and Italian states. 
 Both countries would not associate with other political or military agreements that harms the interests of each other.
 Both parties are subjected to a special conciliation if issues that cannot be resolved via a diplomatic order arise.
 The treaty shall remain in force for five years and may be denounced or renewed for one year before its end.
 The treaty shall be ratified and registered with the League of Nations. The ratification will take place in Rome.

The treaty was accompanied by money provisions to the King making it more appealing for him to sign it by exploiting his desperation. Albania was blocked in the Balkan and European arena by Italy. The treaty brought reactions to Albania's neighbouring country, Yugoslavia. The country took military action against Albania's northern border with the support of France. Mussolini recognised the Franco-Yugoslav pact as an act against Italy.

Second Treaty of Tirana (1927) 
On November 22, 1927, the Second Treaty of Tirana ( Pakti i Dytë i Tiranës) was signed between Albania and Italy, with a duration validity of twenty years. It was a defensive alliance characterised by the Italians as the Treaty of Defense, in Albanian Traktati i Aleancës Mbrojtëse. The internal threat of a famine triggering uprisings and the external threat of Yugoslavia rushed the Albanians to sign the treaty. It intended to remain a secret between the two countries. It tasked Italy to protect the Albanian territory from possible attacks and in return Albania made available to Italy all of its military arsenal. It was favoured by Italy because of its secretive nature. The Second Treaty consisted of seven articles.

 All previously signed Treaties from the accession of Albania in the League of Nations will be examined carefully.
 Inalienable alliance for twenty years unless one of the two countries states differently on the eighteenth or nineteenth year. If not, the treaty will quietly be renewed again.
 Both countries will strive to assist one another to achieve peace. If one party is threatened, the other must provide effective means to stop the attack and provide satisfaction to the attacked party.
 If all means of reconciliation are exhausted, the one party is obliged to use air force and military force, as well as a financial support to assist the attacked party.
 In regards Article 4, neither party is allowed to amnesty, ceasefire or peace negotiations unless its agreed between both parties.
 The treaty is signed in two Albanian and two Italian original copies. Four copies overall. 
 The treaty must be ratified by the respective parliaments and registered in the League of Nations. The ratification will take place in Rome.

It was characterised as a Friendship Pact, Pakti i Miqësisë, as it linked the two countries firmly to each other. The treaty allowed the Italians to bring two hundred and eighty officers to train the Albanian army. Military experts started to instruct Albanian paramilitary groups, whilst allowing in the meantime the Italian navy to access the port of Vlorė. Fortifications were also built, especially that of Librazhdit and conditions and rules were created for the protection of the capital. The treaty meant a lot more to the Italians as it enabled them to enter Albania freely, whether a real or fictional threat existed. Their doorway towards the Balkans had opened. Albania came into an inevitable relationship with Italy. In  Rome, a ministry was created specifically to control the Albanian affairs and count Francesco Jacomoni was appointed minister to Albania.

Outcome 

In 1937, Ciano, the Italian Foreign Minister and Mussolini's son-in-law, mediated with Mussolini to give a further 60 million gold francs to Albania. He saw Albania as a gateway to the Balkans and wanted to expand his plans. This happened because:

 Italy grew tired of Albania and its economic and socio-political problems.
 Italy started to worry about problems of international politics as in 1936-1937 Europe everything started to shift rapidly, especially the political situation in Germany. King Zog fled due to the Italian occupation of Albania on April 7, 1939. The Albanian parliament decided to give the crown of the country to the king of Italy, Victor Emmanuel III on 12 April. The existence of an Italian monarchical constitution suggested that Albania would be at war with countries that opposed Italy. A fascist government was created by the Italians under the Albanian Prime Minister, Shefqet Verlaci. The Albanian military service was fully incorporated into Italy's. Mussolini created a formal Italian protectorate over Albania. On 28 October 1940, Mussolini, launched an attack on Greece using Albania as a gateway. The Italians organised military groups consisting of only Albanians and led by Italian army officials. The invasion aimed to occupy the territory where the Cham Albanians (Çam or Çamë) lived in Western Greece. The Greeks pushed back the Italo-Albanian forces and took over Korcė and Gjirokastėr, closely leading to the expulsion of the Italians from the port of Vlorė. The Greek nationalism, decreased the enthusiasm of the Albanians fighting for the Italians. In May 1941 Albania with the help of the Axis Powers gained control over Kosovo and in November 1941, Albania, known as "Greater Albania" due to the land expansion, declared war against the Soviet Union. Radical Communist ideologies took place and there was a formation of a partisan group. The Albanian partisans detested the monarchy but wanted to take control of the power in their country. In 1941, the Albanian Communist party was created by Enver Hoxha. He was also the editor of the Communist paper Zëri i Popullit (Voice of the People). In November 1944, Enver Hoxha, leader of the partisans, occupied Tirana and exiled Zog from Albania. In December 1945, after a mock election, Hoxha was elected President of Albania. Hoxha sought support from neighbouring countries to help the economic situation in Albania. He turned to Tito's Yugoslavia but because of the removal of the Yugoslavian leader from the Comintern, he cancelled all his agreements and severed all his diplomatic relations. Hoxha followed in Stalin's footsteps that the 1950s Albanian Constitution was a copy of the Soviet Union. In 1961, in the context of the demobilisation of Stalinism, Soviet leader Nikita Khrushchev demanded Hoxha's resignation. Instead, Hoxha severed his diplomatic relations with the Soviet Union and was under the protection of Maoist China. The cooperation of the two countries did not work out and had as a result the isolation of Albania from the rest of the countries both Communist or not. Hoxha declared Albania as the first atheistic state in the world, whose only religion was Albanianism. Any form of religion or religious activity was persecuted and all churches and mosques were turned into stables and warehouses.  Religious relics from Northern Epirus were destroyed by the dictatorial government of the "Greek Christians" on April 21 to show a warm reaction towards Hoxha. In the 1970s, Hoxha approached countries in the West. This did not prevent him from liquidations in the state apparatus. In an attempted military coup in 1974, involving his own Minister of Defense, he executed half of the Central Committee party. He executed army leaders, government officials and old comrades from the guerrilla years. Nearly half of the Central Committee's party of 1948 were executed in the years that followed under his governing. Economic difficulties led to renewed political and economic strifes and many of the government officials were imprisoned for showing resistance against Hoxha's policies. At the same time, kindergarten and elementary school children learned to sing "Uncle Enver" during "spontaneous" events of his people devotion towards him. Hoxha died on April 11, 1985. Hoxhaism existed until 12 June 1991, when the first multi-party parliament was created.

References 

1926 in Albania
Albania–Italy relations
Treaties of Albania
Treaties of the Kingdom of Italy (1861–1946)
Bilateral treaties
1927 in Albania
1926 treaties
1927 treaties